Emily Ann Lloyd (born Emily Ann Morelli; March 27, 1984) is a retired American actress. She is best known for her role as Susan Lovell, the daughter of Jim Lovell, in Apollo 13.

Life and career
Lloyd was born  in Glendale, California, the daughter of Melissa (née Rogers) and David Morelli. and the older sister of actor Eric Lloyd.

She made her debut in 1990 in the Arnold Schwarzenegger film Kindergarten Cop.  For that role she won the Young Artist Award in 1991. After that she played the role of Elizabeth 'Betsy' Gibson Ewing in the television series Knots Landing. In 1997 she reprised her role as teenager in the miniseries Knots Landing: Back to the Cul-de-Sac.

Filmography

References

External links

1984 births
American child actresses
American film actresses
Living people
20th-century American actresses
21st-century American women